Kharian Cantonment railway station (Urdu and ) is located in the Kharian cantonment area near Kharian city, Gujrat district of Punjab province of Pakistan.

See also
 List of railway stations in Pakistan
 Pakistan Railways

References

External links

Railway stations in Gujrat District
Railway stations on Karachi–Peshawar Line (ML 1)